Sabino may refer to:

Places 
 Sabino, São Paulo a municipality in the state of São Paulo, Brazil
 Sabino, Mississippi, an unincorporated community in Quitman County, Mississippi
 Sabino Canyon, a canyon in Arizona

People 
 Sabino (footballer, born 1996), Brazilian football centre-back
 Rafael Sabino (born 1996), Brazilian footballer
 Sabino Barinaga (1922–1988), Spanish footballer
 Sabino (footballer, born 1999), Brazilian football centre-back

Other 
 Sabino dialect, spoken in Central Italy
 Sabino (steamer), a steam ship at Mystic Seaport
 Sabino horse, a color pattern in horses
 Taxodium mucronatum, a tree sometimes known as sabino

See also